Maurice Brun (France, 2 July 1925 – 5 August 2021) was a French politician. He served as mayor of Montluçon from 1972 to 1977 and as a Deputy from 1973 to 1978.

References

1925 births
2021 deaths
20th-century French politicians
Deputies of the 5th National Assembly of the French Fifth Republic
French general councillors
Mayors of places in Auvergne-Rhône-Alpes
People from Montluçon